Folsom, also spelled Folsolm, is an unincorporated community in Perry County, Alabama, United States.

History
Folsom was originally named Cleveland Beat and was a voting precinct during Grover Cleveland's first presidency. The name was then changed to Folsom in honor of Cleveland's wife, Frances Folsom. A post office operated under the name Folsom from 1887 to 1904.

Notes

Unincorporated communities in Perry County, Alabama
Unincorporated communities in Alabama